Hassan Ali Joho (born 26 February 1976) is a Kenyan politician and the former Governor of Mombasa County affiliated with the Orange Democratic Movement (ODM).  He was also elected to represent the Kisauni Constituency in the National Assembly of Kenya during the 2007 Kenyan parliamentary election. On 4 March 2013, during the general election,  Joho was elected as the first governor of Mombasa County. In the 2017 General Elections held on 8 August, Joho retained his seat on an ODM ticket. Despite significant politically engineered setbacks, Joho emerged triumphant by winning with 220 576 votes against his closest rival Suleiman Shahbal with 69 322 votes, Suleiman is a member of the Jubilee Party. Joho served as governor of Mombasa until 2022 when he completed his ten year term paving way for his successor Abdulswammad Sharrif Nassir the former member of the National Assembly for Mvita Constituency.

Political career
Joho joined active politics in the year 2004, and became the Kisauni party chairman for the Liberal Democratic Party between 2006-2007. It was not until 2007 General Election, when he was overwhelmingly elected as the Kisauni parliamentary member through ODM party in 2007. He was elected as Member of Parliament for Kisauni constituency and the Assistant Minister for
Transport. On 4 March 2013 he was elected as Governor of Mombasa.

According to The Economist, "He is close to Raila Odinga, Kenya’s main opposition leader, and is said to be financing Mr Odinga’s Orange Democratic Movement party."
Joho is viewed as the political kingpin of the coastal region of Kenya.

2013 Governor Election 
Joho campaigned to be elected as first Governor of Mombasa during the election held on 4 March 2013. He emerged the winner and was sworn in as governor on 27 March.

He won by 132,583 votes, his closest rival Mr Shahbal, was second with 94,905 votes. Shahbal went to court alleging rigging, but his petition was denied. He later went to court to block Joho's swearing in.

Governorship
Joho named his first cabinet which includes;
 Joab Tumbo - Health services,
 Anthony Njaramba - Tourism and Culture Development,
 Mohammed Abbas - Transport and Infrastructure,
 Binty Omar - Agriculture, Livestock and Fisheries,
 Walid Khalid - Finance and Economic Planning,
 Tendai Mtana - Education and Children,
 Mohammed Ibrahim - Trade and Energy,
 Hazel Koitaba - Youth, Gender and Sports,
 Fatma Awale - Water, Environment & Natural Resources,
 Francis Thoya - Lands, Planning & Housing

The Second term in Office saw changes in key cabinet positions while majority of his allies were sidelined for other duties within his government. The Deputy Governor, Hon. William Kingi joined the newly formed administration and his capacity widened to take charge of the Education, ICT & Mombasa Vision 2035 portfolio. Joho's manifesto stipulated the tasks he intends to achieve in his governorship. These include; fishing, tourism, manufacturing, health and sanitation, solid waste management, roads and housing, among others.

The Second term cabinet included:

▪ Maryam Abdillahi - Finance & Economic Planning,

▪ Tawfiq Balala - Transport & Infrastructure

▪ Fawz Rashid - Trade, Tourism & Investment

▪ Hazel Koitaba - Health

▪ Munywoki Kyalo - Youth, Gender & Sports

▪ Dr. Godfrey Nato - Environment, Waste Management & Energy

▪ Fatma Awale - Water & Sanitation

▪ Edward Nyale - Lands, Physical planning & Housing

▪ Hassan Mwamtoa - Agriculture, Livestock & Fisheries

▪ Mtalaki Mwashimba - County Attorney

▪ Joab Tumbo - Chief of Staff

▪ Hon.Rashid Bedzimba - Political Advisor

▪ Binty Omar - Water & Climate change Advisor

▪ Hamisi Mwaguya - Advisor

▪ Dr.Nyangasi Oduwo - Economic Advisor

Hon. Hassan Ali Joho has shown interest and is among the front runners in the upcoming 2022 Presidential elections and will be the first president from the Coastal region of Kenya if elected.

References

External links 

County Governors of Kenya
Orange Democratic Movement politicians
Members of the National Assembly (Kenya)
People from Mombasa
Living people
1976 births